Bacona is an unincorporated community in northern Washington County, Oregon, United States.

History
The Bacona post office operated from May 24, 1897 until January 31, 1934. Bacona was named for the first postmaster, Cyrus Bacon. In part due to the Tillamook Burn of 1933, the community went into a decline and now has very few inhabitants, down from a peak of 70 in 1915.

A sawmill, owned by Peter Hoffman, operated in the area and employed eight men.

References

Unincorporated communities in Washington County, Oregon
Unincorporated communities in Oregon
1897 establishments in Oregon
Populated places established in 1897
1934 disestablishments in Oregon